Cetimaique trinodosa is a species of beetle in the family Cerambycidae, the only species in the genus Cetimaique.

References

Hesperophanini